Dustin Brown and Andrea Vavassori were the defending champions but only Brown chose to defend his title, partnering Evan King. Brown lost in the first round to Lukáš Klein and Igor Zelenay.

Alexander Erler and Lucas Miedler won the title after defeating Zdeněk Kolář and Denys Molchanov 6–3, 6–4 in the final.

Seeds

Draw

References

External links
 Main draw

NÖ Open - Doubles